The 1998 FIBA EuroLeague Final Four was the 1997–98 season's FIBA EuroLeague Final Four tournament, organized by FIBA Europe.

Kinder Bologna won its first title, after defeating AEK in the EuroLeague Finals, in the lowest scoring final ever.

Bracket

Semifinals

Partizan Zepter – Kinder Bologna

Benetton Treviso – AEK

Third Place Game

Final

Awards

FIBA EuroLeague Final Four MVP 
 Zoran Savić (Virtus Bologna)

FIBA EuroLeague Finals Top Scorer 
 Antoine Rigaudeau (Virtus Bologna)

FIBA EuroLeague All-Final Four Team

References

External links 
EuroLeague 1998–99 at FIBA Europe website
EuroLeague at Linguasport

1997-98
1997–98 in Spanish basketball
1997–98 in Yugoslav basketball
1997–98 in Italian basketball
1997–98 in Greek basketball
International basketball competitions hosted by Spain
International basketball competitions hosted by Catalonia